Serbia competed at the Junior Eurovision Song Contest 2009, held in Kyiv, Ukraine. RTS held a national final to select the fourth Serbian entry for the contest in September 2009.
The winner of pre-selection and Serbian representative in Kyiv was the group Ništa Lično with pop-rock song "Onaj pravi". The group members are Anica Cvetković, the leading vocal, Aleksandar Graić, composer and pianist, who is a son of composer of "Molitva", winning song of Eurovision Song Contest 2007, Una Krlić and Karolina Lodi, as the guitarists and Petar Cvetković, Anica's brother, with drums.

Before Junior Eurovision

National final 
RTS received 60 songs for the participation in the contest. A selection committee of music editors from RTS picked 10 songs that competed in the televised final. Public favourites were Boško Baloš, Jelena Krvavac, Emilija Marković, Marija Ugrica and the eventual winners Ništa Lično according to websites, online polls and the media.

The final took place in the studio 9 of the RTS Studios in Košutnjak on 19 September 2009. The winner was chosen by jury and televoting.

At Junior Eurovision 
During the allocation draw on 13 October 2009, Serbia was drawn to perform 5th, following Romania and preceding Georgia. Serbia placed 10th, scoring 34 points.

In Serbia, show were broadcast on RTS 2 with commentary by Duška Vučinić-Lučić. The Serbian spokesperson revealing the result of the Serbian vote was Nevena Božović who represented Serbia in 2007 contest.

Voting

Notes

References

External links 
  RTS website

Serbia
Junior Eurovision Song Contest
2009